Psychoneuroendocrinology is a monthly peer-reviewed scientific journal covering research in psychoneuroendocrinology published by Elsevier. It is an official journal of the  International Society of Psychoneuroendocrinology and was established in 1976. The editor-in-chief is Elizabeth Shirtcliff (University of Oregon). The journal publishes papers dealing with the interrelated disciplines of psychology, neurobiology, endocrinology, immunology, neurology, and psychiatry, with an emphasis on studies integrating these disciplines in terms of either basic research or clinical implications.

The journal and society support the "Bruce McEwen Lifetime Achievement award" for contributions to the understanding of brain-body interactions and the "Dirk Hellhammer award" to distinguished young investigators in the field of psychoneuroendocrinology.

Abstracting and indexing
The journal is abstracted and indexed in:

According to the Journal Citation Reports, the journal has a 2021 impact factor of 4.693.

References

External links

Elsevier academic journals
Endocrinology journals
Neuroscience journals
Monthly journals
Publications established in 1976
English-language journals